Devil's Highway or The Devil's Highway may refer to:

Roads
Devil's Highway (New Mexico) or U.S. Route 491, from its former designation as U.S. Route 666 New Mexico, Colorado and Utah (USA)
Devil's Highway (Roman Britain), the Roman road from Londinium (London) to Calleva Atrebatum (Silchester)
Devil's Highway (Sonora), also called El Camino del Diablo, a prehistoric and colonial trail through the Sonora Desert in Arizona (USA) and Sonora (Mexico)
Route A666 in England, nicknamed the "Devil's Highway" both because of the number 666 and the road's high accident rate

Arts entertainment, and media
Devil's Highway (film), a 2005 horror film directed by Fabien Pruvot
The Devil's Highway: A True Story (2004), Luís Alberto Urrea's creative non-fiction book that describes the harrowing May 2001 attempt of 26 men to cross the Mexican border into the desert of southern Arizona, a region known as the Devil's Highway; in 2005, the book was nominated for both the Pulitzer Prize for General Nonfiction and Kiriyama Prize for Nonfiction

See also
 Devil's Causeway, the Roman Road along Hadrian's Wall